Cathedral is the third major-press collection of short stories by American writer Raymond Carver, published in 1983.

Reception
Cathedral was enthusiastically received by critics.  In The New York Times book Review, critic Irving Howe wrote:

The Washington Post wrote that "there are no arid places in Cathedral. Instead there are a dozen stories that overflow with the danger, excitement, mystery and possibility of life."

The stories
The collection contains the following stories:

"Feathers" - A couple visit another couple who have a peacock and a baby.
"Chef's House" - Wes rents Chef's house by the ocean and asks wife Edna to come live with him again.
"Preservation" - Sandy's husband has taken to the sofa since he lost his job as a roofer three months before.
"The Compartment" - Myers, vacationing in Europe, takes a train to meet his son, who he hasn't seen in eight years.
"A Small, Good Thing" - An extended version of his earlier short story "The Bath". Scotty, 8, is hit by a car.
"Vitamins" - Patti decides to sell vitamins door-to-door.
"Careful" - Lloyd and wife Inez are living separately but she helps him with a problem.
"Where I'm Calling From" - At Frank Martin's drying out facility with JP, Tiny, and other residents.
"The Train" - Miss Dent waits in a train station late at night after she used a gun to force a man to kneel and plead for his life. 
"Fever" - Carlyle has trouble finding a babysitter after his wife leaves him and the kids for California. 
"The Bridle" - Marge, a woman who supervises an apartment building in Arizona with her husband Harley, tells the story about a family that moves into an apartment after being displaced from their farm in Minnesota.
"Cathedral" - Narrated by a man whose wife is old friends with a blind man, the story shows the husband/narrator's distaste for the blind man who is coming to visit him and his wife for a few days.  At times it seems that the man is jealous of the blind man for being so close to his wife; at other times it seems that the husband is disgusted by the man's blindness.  In the end they bond in a way through the communication they share about what a cathedral looks like.

References
 Carver, Raymond. Cathedral New York: Knopf (1983); London: Collins (1984)

External links
Stephen King on Raymond Carver in The New York Times Book Review
Irving Howe on Cathedral and "A Small, Good Thing" in The New York Times Book Review

1983 short story collections
Short story collections by Raymond Carver
Alfred A. Knopf books